Infratil Limited is a New Zealand-based infrastructure investment company. It owns renewable energy, digital infrastructure, airports, and healthcare assets with operations in New Zealand, Australia, Asia, the US and Europe. Infratil was founded by the late Lloyd Morrison, a Wellington-based merchant banker. Morrison's company, H. R. L. Morrison & Co, is responsible for Infratil's management and administration.

History
Infratil was one of the world's first listed infrastructure funds when it was established and listed on the New Zealand Exchange in 1994.  Its first investment was a minority stake in Trustpower.  It expanded into airport ownership in 1998 when it bought a 66% shareholding in Wellington Airport. More recently Infratil has invested into the Digital Infrastructure and Healthcare sectors. Infratil was named Amazon Web Services Company of the Year at the Deloitte Top 200 Awards for 2021. Infratil was also recognised in the IJInvestor awards with APAC Fund Performance of the year.   Over the last 10 years (from 1 April 2012 to 31 March 2022) Infratil delivered above average annual returns of 21.6%.

Investments
The following companies are either wholly or partially owned by Infratil.

Renewable Energy
Manawa Energy (formerly Trustpower) is New Zealand's fifth largest electricity generator, generating approximately 9% of New Zealand's total hydro capacity. Manawa Energy owns 26 hydro power schemes with a total installed capacity of 498MW. Infratil owns 50.76% of Manawa Energy.
Mint Renewables is an Australian based renewable energy developer focused on the development, ownership, and operation of wind and solar energy projects, as well as storage solutions across Australia. Infratil owns 73% of Mint Renewables.
Longroad Energy is a Boston-headquartered renewable energy developer focused on the development, ownership, and operation and asset management of wind and solar energy projects throughout the U.S. Longroad Energy was founded in 2016, and is the reformulated team of First Wind, one of the most successful independent renewable energy development teams in the U.S. As at 31 March 2022 Longroad had 1.7GW of operating assets and 13.7GW total pipeline. Infratil owns 37.1% of the business.
Galileo  Energy is a pan-European, multi-technology, renewable energy developer, owner and operator headquartered in Zurich, Switzerland. Galileo has a 6.0GW development pipeline as at 30 September 2022. Infratil owns 40% of Galileo.
Gurin Energy is a Singapore-headquartered renewable energy developer focused on the development, ownership, and operation of wind and solar energy projects, as well as storage solutions, throughout Asia. Infratil owns 95% of Gurin Energy.

Former
Tilt Renewables. In 2021 Infratil contracted to sell and subsequently completed the sale of its 65.15% stake in Tilt Renewables for $2,002 million. 
Z Energy. On 29 March 2010 a consortium owned 50% by Infratil and 50% by the Guardians of New Zealand Superannuation executed a sale and purchase agreement for the acquisition of Shell New Zealand's distribution and retail businesses and 17.1% interest in the New Zealand Refining Company. The agreement was completed on 1 April 2010. Initially named Greenstone Energy, it began to re-brand the service stations as Z in May 2011. Chief executive Mike Bennetts said that the cost of using the Shell brand, believed to be about NZ$10 million a year, was a factor in the decision. Infratil sold the remaining 20% stake in Z Energy in September 2015. 
Energy Developments Limited. A holding in Energy Developments Limited was sold into the takeover offer by Greenspark Power Holding Ltd for A$139.9 million in January 2010.

Healthcare
Qscan is one of Australia's largest radiology providers, operating over 70 clinics across Australia. Qscan provides comprehensive diagnostic imaging services such as x-rays, ultrasound, CT scans and MRI scans. Infratil owns 56% of Qscan.
RHCNZ Medical Imaging Group. Consisting of Pacific Radiology, Auckland Radiology, and Bay Radiology, the RHCNZ Medical Imaging Group is New Zealand's largest diagnostic imaging provider. The combined group operates over 70 clinics nationwide, with 31 clinics in the South Island and 39 in the North Island. Infratil owns 50.1% of RHCNZ Medical Imaging Group.
RetireAustralia. In December 2014 Infratil and its partner, the New Zealand Superannuation Fund, each acquired 50% of RetireAustralia, a retirement operator with headquarters in Brisbane, Australia and over 4,000 independent living units and apartments across 27 villages in NSW, South Australia and Queensland.

Former
Metlifecare On 25 October 2013 Infratil advised the NZX it was to acquire a 19.9% in Metlifecare New Zealand's second largest village and aged care operator. The agreement was completed on 28 November 2013. On 7 April 2017 Infratil sold its 19.91% holding via a block trade on the NZX.

Airports

Current
Wellington International Airport – 66% ownership through wholly owned subsidiary NZ Airports who purchased the stake in 1998, with Wellington City Council retaining the remaining 34%

Former
Glasgow Prestwick Airport (sold to the Scottish government in November 2013)
Manston Airport (sold to Ann Gloag in November 2013)
Lübeck Airport Infratil exercised its put option in respect of its 90% shareholding and ownership has transferred to the City of Lübeck on 30 October 2009
NZ Bus – 100% ownership, purchased in 2005 from Stagecoach. As of 24 December 2018, Infratil is selling NZ Bus to Australian equity firm Next Capital, subject to a consenting process that completed in June 2019.
Snapper Services Limited – 100% ownership through Infratil subsidiary Swift Transportation.

Digital Infrastructure
CDC Data Centres is headquartered in Canberra, Australia, CDC Data Centres is the largest privately owned and operated data centre business across Australia and New Zealand. As at 31 March it had 9 data centres across 4 campuses in Australia and is adding 104MW of capacity in 2023 across 4 new data centres.
Vodafone New Zealand is one of New Zealand's leading digital services and connectivity companies providing more than 3 million connections to consumer and business companies.
Kao Data. Based in London, Kao Data develops and operates technically advanced, highly sustainable colocation data centres. Kao Data's data centres are specifically designed to meet the advanced computing needs of Hyperscale, Enterprise, High Performance Computing and Artificial Intelligence customers.
Clearvision is focused on investing in companies that can apply innovations in IoT, Big Data, and Security Technology, to drive meaningful disruptions in energy and infrastructure sustainability.

References

External links

Financial services companies of New Zealand
Companies based in Wellington
Companies listed on the New Zealand Exchange
Financial services companies established in 1994
New Zealand companies established in 1994
1994 initial public offerings